Ricardo Raúl Albisbeascoechea Pertica (born 18 August 1960), known as Ricardo Albis or simply Albis, is an Argentine retired footballer who played as a midfielder, and a current coach.

References

External links

1960 births
Living people
Sportspeople from Mar del Plata
Argentine people of Basque descent
Association football midfielders
Argentine Primera División players
Club Atlético Independiente footballers
Racing Club de Avellaneda footballers
CD Málaga footballers
CD Logroñés footballers
Real Valladolid players
Deportivo de La Coruña players
Real Balompédica Linense footballers
Argentine football managers
Málaga CF managers
Argentine expatriate footballers
Argentine footballers
Argentine expatriate football managers
Argentine expatriate sportspeople in Spain
Expatriate footballers in Spain
Expatriate football managers in Spain
Club Recreativo Granada managers